New Retro Arcade: Neon is a virtual reality first-person video game developed and published for the PC by  independent developer Digital Cybercherries. It was released on Steam on August 1, 2016. The game is compatible with the HTC Vive and Oculus Rift.

Gameplay
Players are taken back to the '80s/early '90s and are put inside a retro arcade room. In the game, players are able to interact with mini-games including Bowling, Air Hockey Skeeball, and more. Inside the room itself are usable objects such as Guitars, Drum Machines and Light Guns. The main feature of the game focuses on customisation and being able to emulate your favourite arcade games, by using any of the 30 Arcade Cabinets. The game also supports Non-VR.

Reception 
UploadVR favoured the game for its authenticity and how Digital Cybercherries do an excellent job of capturing the vibe and atmosphere. Road to VR wrote that the game is an immensely detailed arcade simulator.

New Retro Arcade: Neon won VRDB's Players Choice VR of the Year 2016. It currently has a rating of 83%, Very Positive on Steam.

References

External links 

 

2016 video games
Simulation video games
Video games developed in the United Kingdom
Video games set in the 1980s
Virtual reality games
Windows games
Windows-only games
Unreal Engine games